The 2021 Indoor Football League season was the thirteenth (and twelfth complete) season of the Indoor Football League (IFL).  The league played the season with twelve teams, down from thirteen the previous season, by adding one expansion team, one team from the National Arena League, one team from the American Arena League, and four teams going on hiatus.  In addition, three existing teams made their IFL on-field debut after the 2020 season was cancelled because of the COVID-19 pandemic.

As there were still many pandemic-related restrictions still in place during early 2021, the start of the season was delayed from February to April with the postseason to begin in August. The top eight teams qualified for the postseason with the Massachusetts Pirates, playing their first season in the IFL, defeating the Arizona Rattlers in the United Bowl on September 12.

Offseason 
On June 26, 2020, the Columbus Wild Dogs announced that they would not begin play until 2022. On August 19, 2020, the Massachusetts Pirates, formerly of the National Arena League, were added to the IFL for the 2021 season as the league's first East Coast-based team. On August 25, the league added the Northern Arizona Wranglers in Prescott Valley, Arizona, for the 2021 season, joining the Arizona Rattlers and Tucson Sugar Skulls as the third IFL team to be based in Arizona for 2021. On November 6, the Louisville Xtreme of Louisville, Kentucky, was added. The 2020 expansion Oakland Panthers, as well as the Cedar Rapids River Kings, Quad City Steamwheelers, and the San Diego Strike Force withdrew from the season due to the effects of the pandemic.

The initial schedule for the twelve teams was announced on November 17, 2020, with all teams playing 16 games between March 28 and July 24, 2021, before the playoffs. On February 17, the league pushed back its start date to April 23 for four teams, with the rest of the teams to start on May 14. The four teams that started on April 23 were to still have 16 games, but the others teams were to play a reduced 14-game schedule.

Teams

Regular season

Standings

Schedule
The season began on the weekend of April 23–24 with two games: the Bismarck Bucks at the Green Bay Blizzard and the Massachusetts Pirates at the Louisville Xtreme. The four teams were the only teams playing until May 15 when the other teams joined. After initially postponing the Xtreme's June 12 home game, the IFL subsequently terminated the Xtreme's membership due to failing to maintain the league's minimum obligations and the team did not finish the season. All of the Xtreme's games were removed from the schedule.

Playoffs
The top eight teams made the IFL playoffs, where teams were ranked by winning percentage due to the imbalanced schedule. After Louisville was terminated midseason, the schedule was further imbalanced leading to several tiebreaker parameters needing to be used resulting in the fourth place Duke City Gladiators and fifth place Iowa Barnstormers switching seeding for the playoffs.

The quarterfinals consisted of the top seed hosting the eighth seed, the second seed hosting the seventh seed, the third seed hosting the sixth seed, and the fourth hosting the fifth seed. In the semifinals, the highest remaining seed hosts the lower remaining seed and the next-highest hosts the next-lowest from the quarterfinals. The semifinal winners then meet in the 2021 United Bowl.

References

Indoor Football League seasons
Indoor Football League
IFL